In software design, web design, and electronic product design, synthetic monitoring (also known as active monitoring or proactive monitoring) is a monitoring technique that is done by using a simulation or scripted recordings of transactions.  Behavioral scripts (or paths) are created to simulate an action or path that a customer or end-user would take on a site, application, or other software (or even hardware).  Those paths are then continuously monitored at specified intervals for performance, such as functionality, availability, and response time measures.

Synthetic monitoring enables a webmaster or an IT/Operations professional to identify problems and determine if a website or application is slow or experiencing downtime before that problem affects actual end-users or customers. This type of monitoring does not require actual traffic, thus the name synthetic, so it enables companies to test applications 24x7, or test new applications prior to a live customer-facing launch.

Because synthetic monitoring is a simulation of typical user behavior or navigation through a website, it is often best used to monitor commonly trafficked paths and critical business processes. Synthetic tests must be scripted in advance, so it is not feasible to measure performance for every permutation of a navigational path an end-user might take.  This is more suited for passive monitoring.

Synthetic testing is useful for measuring uptime, availability, and response time of critical pages and transactions (how a site performs from all geographies) but doesn't monitor or capture actual end-user interactions, see Website monitoring.

Synthetic monitoring will report myriad metrics, and it's up to the  a webmaster or an IT/Operations professional to identify which ones are most important. Common metrics from synthetic website monitoring includes Time to First Byte, Speed Index, Time to Interactive, and Page Complete.

See also 
 Application performance management
 Website monitoring

References 

Network management